Aechmea poitaei is a species of flowering plant in the genus Aechmea. This species is native to Ecuador, Colombia, Peru and French Guiana.

References

poitaei
Flora of South America
Plants described in 1889